The 1896 United States presidential election in Kentucky took place on November 3, 1896. All contemporary 45 states were part of the 1896 United States presidential election. Kentucky voters chose 13 electors to the Electoral College, which selected the president and vice president.

William McKinley won the state very narrowly, becoming the first Republican presidential candidate to ever win Kentucky and the only to carry the state until Calvin Coolidge in 1924.

Background and vote
Ever since the Civil War, Kentucky had been shaped politically by divisions created by that war between secessionist, Democratic counties and Unionist, Republican ones, although the state as a whole leaned Democratic throughout this era and the GOP would never carry the state during the Third Party System. However, the Democratic Party in the state was heavily divided over free silver and the role of corporations in the middle 1890s, and it lost the governorship for the first time in forty years in 1895 due to Populist defections. For the 1896 election, the Democratic Party would aim to fuse with the Populists, and adopted the Populist free silver platform under former Nebraska Representative William Jennings Bryan.

In contrast to the majority of antebellum slave states, Kentucky was sufficiently close to the industrial Northeast that it had a significant urban working class in its Ohio River cities that opposed free silver because it would cause inflation. Similar views were held by workers in Kentucky’s developing coal mining industry. Polls late in October nonetheless showed Bryan carrying the state by a margin only slightly reduced from what discredited incumbent President Grover Cleveland had achieved in 1892. A week later, however, polls had Republican nominees, former Ohio Governor William McKinley and his running mate Garret Hobart of New Jersey carrying Kentucky by seventeen thousand votes. As it turned out, the state was exceedingly close, with McKinley becoming the first Republican presidential candidate to carry Kentucky, by a mere 277 votes, or 0.06352%. Owing to the direct election of presidential electors and the extreme closeness of the result, one Bryan elector and twelve McKinley electors were chosen.

McKinley’s victory is, by percentage margin, the seventh-closest popular results for presidential electors on record.

Results

Results by county

Notes

References

Kentucky
1896
1896 Kentucky elections